Jam music may refer to:

Jam band
Jam session, an impromptu musical performance
Jam! Music, a Canadian website
JamMusic, member of Jam Cast Management (HK) Ltd
Jam Music, a music app developed by Playlist.com